Mary E. McLeod is a costume designer. She was nominated for a Genie Award for Best Achievement in Costume Design at the 28th Genie Awards.

Recognition 
 2008 Genie Award for Best Achievement in Costume Design - Fido - Nominee
 1984 Genie Award for Best Achievement in Costume Design - A Christmas Story - Nominated

External links 
 
 

Canadian costume designers
Year of birth missing (living people)
Living people
Place of birth missing (living people)
Canadian women in film
Women costume designers